Mohammad Mahbubur Rahman Jewel is a Bangladeshi footballer who plays as a forward for Sheikh Jamal DC and the Bangladesh national team. As a versatile forward, he can operate as a centre forward, second striker or winger.

Club career

Early career
Jewel started football training under Ibrahim Khalil, a local coach, in his early age. He trained along with Sohel Rana, Pappu Hossain in there. In 2013, he got admitted in Bangladesh Krira Shikkha Protishtan by passing exam. He played in many tournaments in Bangladesh and India for BKSP youth team.

Jewel played in 2015 Pioneer Football League, country's grassroot youth league, for Bangladesh Ansar FC. He played a vital role in making his team champion as he was the Most Valuable Player and top scorer of the league. He scored total 22 goals in the league including one in the final match.

Fakirerpool YMC
In 2016, Jewel joined Bangladesh Championship League side Fakirerpool Young Men's Club, after playing in sixth tier Pioneer League. Fakirerpool became champion in that season.

Arambagh KS
In 2017, Jewel signed for top-tier side Arambagh KS, a club which is well known in the country for producing young talents. He scored 3 goals to become the top scorer of 2017–18 Independence Cup and helped his team Arambagh to clinch their first-ever domestic silverware. On 12 September 2017,  Jewel scored his first goal in the Bangladesh Premier League against Farashganj SC in his team's 2–1 win.

Bangladesh Police FC
In 2019, Jewel signed for newly promoted top-tier club Bangladesh Police FC. He struggled in the first season with Police FC as he couldn't make any appearance. However, he became a regular starter from the beginning of the 2020–21 season under new head coach Pakir Ali. He made his debut for Police FC on 24 December 2020 in a Federation Cup match. On 22 February 2021, he scored his first goal for Police FC against giant Sheikh Jamal DC in 2020–21 BPL. On 7 May 2021, he scored a brace against Uttar Baridhara and helped his team to make a comeback from 1-0 behind. He finished the 2020–21 BPL season with 4 goals and 3 assists in 18 league games.

Sheikh Russel
On 24 October 2021, Jewel got his big move to Sheikh Russel KC. On 27 November 2021, he made his debut for the club during a 1–0 over Uttar Baridhara in the 2021 Independence Cup opening group-stage game. On 9 February 2022, Jewel scored his first goal for the club, during a league game against Chittagong Abahani.

International career

Youth
After admitting in BKSP in 2013, Jewel called up in Bangladesh U16 ahead of 2013 SAFF U-16 Championship. He didn't make any appearance in the tournament.

As he was eligible to play, he was also included in the Bangladesh squad for 2015 SAFF U-16 Championship. Bangladesh became champion in that edition. However, Jewel didn't make any appearance this time too.

He also called up in Bangladesh U19 team, but couldn't make into the final squad.

Senior
In March 2021, Jewel got his first call up in preliminary squad of Bangladesh national team as a u-23 standby player ahead of Three Nations cup. He impressed national team head coach Jamie Day with only one day of training. As a result, he was included in the final squad and traveled to Nepal. However, he didn't make debut in that tournament.

On 6 March 2021, Jewel made his international debut for Bangladesh against Afghanistan in 2022 FIFA World Cup qualification match. He came from the bench as a substitute on the 73rd minute.

Statistics

International

References 

Bangladeshi footballers
2001 births
Living people
Footballers from Dhaka
Arambagh KS players
Bangladesh Police FC players
Sheikh Russel KC players
Sheikh Jamal Dhanmondi Club
Bangladesh Football Premier League players
Association football forwards
Bangladesh youth international footballers
Bangladesh international footballers